Eliezer Kalina (25 March 1948 – 29 April 2007) was an Israeli paralympic champion.

Kalina began practicing sports at the age of 10. He was a member of Hapoel Petah Tikva youth football team and, simultaneously, a member of the club's volleyball team. In 1966 he transferred to Hapoel Herzliya, in which he played until he was injured during the Yom Kippur War. Prior to the war he graduated from Wingate College of Physical Education and began studying in the United States.

Kalina returned to Israel to join the IDF during the war. On 18  October 1973, he was in a half-track in Syrian territory.  The task they were sent for was aborted and Kalina and his team remained within Syrian borders until they could retreat. The half-track was spotted and attacked. Two of Kalina's team members were killed and his own leg was amputated. During his rehabilitation he studied law, but focused his interest in sports.

Throughout the years Kalina was a member of the IDF veterans volleyball team. In 1974, he established a volleyball team in the rehabilitation center he practiced in, and began serving as its coach. As both player and coach he shared three gold medals and one silver medal at the Paralympic Games. In 1992 they reached sixth place.

Kalina was active in sports until the early 2000s (decade). He also completed MBA studies and an MA in political science, while working for Tel Aviv University and the Prime Minister's Office.

External links
 
 Eliezer Kalina at World ParaVolley

1948 births
2007 deaths
Israeli men's volleyball players
Hapoel Petah Tikva F.C. players
Hapoel Herzliya F.C. players
Liga Leumit players
Volleyball coaches
Jewish volleyball players
Paralympic athletes of Israel
Paralympic volleyball players of Israel
Paralympic gold medalists for Israel
Paralympic silver medalists for Israel
Paralympic medalists in volleyball
Athletes (track and field) at the 1976 Summer Paralympics
Volleyball players at the 1976 Summer Paralympics
Volleyball players at the 1980 Summer Paralympics
Volleyball players at the 1984 Summer Paralympics
Volleyball players at the 1988 Summer Paralympics
Volleyball players at the 1996 Summer Paralympics
Volleyball players at the 2000 Summer Paralympics
Medalists at the 1976 Summer Paralympics
Medalists at the 1980 Summer Paralympics
Medalists at the 1984 Summer Paralympics
Medalists at the 1988 Summer Paralympics
Track and field athletes with disabilities
Israeli sitting volleyball players
Men's sitting volleyball players
Association footballers not categorized by position
Israeli footballers